Elahi is Aramaic and literally means "My God."

Otherwise it may refer to:

Places 

 Choqa Elahi, a village in Kermanshah Province, Iran.
 Gheyb-e Elahi, a village in Fars Province, Iran.

Name

Given name 

 Elahi Ardabili, (870-940), an Iranian author and scholar.
 Elahi Bux Soomro, (1997-2001), a Pakistani senior politician and legislator.

Surname 

 Amir Elahi, (1908-1980), Pakistani cricketer
 Chaudhry Pervaiz Elahi, (b. 1945), first Deputy Prime Minister of Pakistan.
 Chaudhry Zahoor Elahi, (assassinated 1981), a Pakistani statesman.
 Hasan M. Elahi, (b. 1972), Bangladeshi born American artist and professor.
 Imtiaz Inayat Elahi, a senior bureaucrat of Pakistan's Civil Services.
 Manzoor Elahi, (b. 1963), a former Pakistani cricketer 
 Moonis Elahi, (b. 1976), a Pakistani politician
 Nur Ali Elahi, (1895-1974),  Kurdish spiritual thinker, musician, philosopher and jurist. or.
 Saleem Elahi, (b. 1976), former Pakistani cricketer.
 Shahzad Elahi, (b. 1965), a Pakistani politician.
 Syed Manzur Elahi, a businessperson in Bangladesh. 
 Zahoor Elahi, (b. 1971), a Pakistani cricketer.

Middle name 
 Ehsan Elahi Zaheer, (1945–1987), Pakistani Islamic scholar and author.
 Daniel Elahi Galán, (b. 1996), a Colombian tennis player.
 Hossein Elahi Ghomshei, (b. 1940), an Iranian scholar, author and lecturer.
 Tawfiq-e-Elahi Chowdhury, (b. 1972), the energy adviser to the Prime Minister of Bangladesh.

See also 

 Allahi